Järnefelt is a surname originating in Sweden and Finland. Notable people with the surname include:

Aino Sibelius (née Järnefelt; 1871–1969), Finnish wife of composer Jean Sibelius
Alexander Järnefelt (1833–1896), Finnish general, political figure, and topographer
Armas Järnefelt (1869–1958), Finnish composer and conductor
Arvid Järnefelt (1861–1932), Finnish judge and writer
Eero Järnefelt (1863–1937), Finnish realist painter
Elisabeth Järnefelt (1839–1929), “mother of Finnish art and culture”
Eero Järnefelt (diplomat) (1888-1970), diplomat, ambassador. Son of Arvid
Gustaf Järnefelt (1901–1989), Finnish astronomer
Maikki Järnefelt (1871–1929), Finnish opera singer

See also
 1558 Järnefelt, a main belt asteroid

Swedish-language surnames